A holy water font or stoup is a vessel containing holy water which is generally placed near the entrance of a church. It is often placed at the base of a crucifix or religious representation.  It is used in the Catholic Church, Anglican Churches, and some Lutheran churches to make the Sign of the Cross using the holy water upon entrance of the church. Holy water is blessed by a priest or a deacon, and many Christians believe it to be a reminder of the baptismal promises.

See also

Baptismal font
Nipson anomemata me monan opsin
Home stoup, for usage and blessing at home

References

External links
"Holy Water Fonts" Catholic Encyclopedia article
Using Holy Water in Daily Devotions by The Rev. Brandon L. Filbert (The Protestant Episcopal Church)

Christian religious objects
Church architecture